Acianthella (elf orchids) is  a small genus of tropical ground orchids previously included in Acianthus but is now distinguished "by tiny green flowers on long thin ovaries, sepals of similar shape and size, lacking apical clubs, narrow petals and no basal glands on the labellum." There are about 7 species altogether, two endemic to Australia, and 5 to New Caledonia. Both the Australian species are self-pollinating and very difficult to grow. It was described by David LLoyd Jones and Mark Alwin Clements in 2004. The type-species is Acianthella amplexicaulis.

List of species 
 Acianthella amplexicaulis 
 Acianthella sublesta

Footnotes

References 
 Jones, David L. (2006). A Complete Guide to Native Orchids of Australia, Including the Island Territories. New Holland Publishers, Frenchs Forest, N.S.W. 2086 Australia. .
 IPNI, Plant Name Details for Acianthella. Retrieved 28 September 2009

Acianthinae
Diurideae genera